Hrašćina is a municipality in the Krapina-Zagorje County in Croatia. According to the 2001 census, there are 1,826 inhabitants in the area, absolute majority which are Croats. It is known for its meteorite.

Populated places in Krapina-Zagorje County
Municipalities of Croatia